Kennedy Lake is located in Tucson at J. F. Kennedy Park, north of Ajo Way between La Cholla Boulevard and Mission Road.

Fish species
 Rainbow Trout
 Largemouth Bass
 Sunfish
 Channel Catfish
 Carp

References

External links
 Arizona Fishing Locations Map
 Arizona Boating Locations Facilities Map
 Video of Kennedy Lake, Arizona

Reservoirs in Pima County, Arizona
Reservoirs in Arizona